Cheesa Laureta (born August 4, 1990), known by the mononym Cheesa, is a Filipina-American Pop/R&B singer and songwriter most noted for her run on NBC's The Voice in 2012.  After being chosen by Cee Lo Green, mentored by Babyface, and making it to the Quarter-Finals, Cheesa was eliminated from The Voice in April 2012.  Since The Voice, Cheesa has focused on developing her solo career, releasing the Asian iTunes chart-topping single, "I'm Not Perfect (feat. Charice)" and her debut album, NAKED.

Early life 

Cheesa Laureta was born on August 4, 1990 in Oahu, Hawaii to Filipino parents Martiniana and Joseph. She lived in Ewa Beach and Kalihi and attended the all-girl Catholic St. Francis School in Manoa.  At age 16, Cheesa and her family moved to Los Angeles to pursue her dream of being a singer. Cheesa graduated from Hollywood High School in 2008, and auditioned for The Voice in 2011. Her brother is musical-director Troy Laureta who has worked with singers Ariana Grande and Jake Zyrus.

The Voice 

Cheesa auditioned for The Voice in 2011, when she was 21. The episode featuring her blind audition was aired February 27, 2012.  Her rendition of Beyoncé's "If I Were a Boy" earned her a spot on Cee Lo Green's team. While preparing for the Battle Rounds, Cheesa worked closely with Babyface (musician), one of her biggest influences. The March 5, 2012 broadcast of The Voice saw Cheesa beat teammate and competitor Angie Johnson in the Battle Round singing Bonnie Tyler's "Total Eclipse of the Heart."  In the Live Round on April 9, 2012, Cheesa's version of Harold Melvin & the Blue Notes's "Don't Leave Me This Way" placed her in Cee Lo's "Bottom Three," but her Last Chance Performance on April 10, 2012 of "All By Myself" convinced Cee Lo to keep her in the running.  Cheesa's career on The Voice came to a close in the Live Quarter-Finals and elimination rounds held on April 23 & 24, 2012.  She ended up in Cee Lo Green's "Bottom Two" after singing "I Have Nothing" by Whitney Houston.  In her Last Chance Performance, she sang Kelly Clarkson's "Already Gone," but Cee Lo ultimately had to let her go.

Solo career 

The Voice provided Cheesa her first experience performing as a solo artist, and since the season's end she has continued to develop her solo career. In a collaboration with fellow Filipina vocalist Charice, Cheesa released her single, "I'm Not Perfect (feat. Charice)" on September 6, 2012.  The soulful power ballad advocating self-acceptance reached #1 in Asia and #12 on the US Pop iTunes Chart.  Following the success of her single, Cheesa released her debut studio album, "Naked," on April 30, 2013.  Included on the album are "I'm Not Perfect" and a dubstep rendition of Britney Spears's "Toxic."

Management 

Cheesa is a member of, and managed by, The Assembly Entertainment, a Los Angeles-based music production and artist management company that has worked with the likes of Charice, Jordan Pruitt, Melanie Fiona, David Foster, and Darkchild.

Discography 
Bakit Pa (2020, Kaibigan: A Troy Laureta OPM Collective, Vol. 1, Star Music)
Kaba (2021, Giliw: A Troy Laureta OPM Collective, Vol. 2, Star Music)

References 

Kato, Nicole. "Many Looks, One Big Voice." MidWeek. 20 March 2012. Web. 15 May 2013. <http://www.midweek.com/cheesa-laureta-nbc-the-voice/#870>
Epstein, Marni.  "10 Questions With Cheesa." MadeWoman. 20 May 2013.  Web. 6 June 2013. <https://web.archive.org/web/20160303213528/http://www.madewomanmag.com/index.php?option=com_k2&view=item&id=599:entertainment-%7C-cheesa-interview&Itemid=170>
Medenilla, Krizia.  "Getting to Know Cheesa and Troy Laureta." Bakitwhy Entertainment. Web. 6 June 2013. <http://www.bakitwhy.com/articles/getting-know-cheesa-and-troy-laureta>
"Adobo Close-Up: Cheesa and Troy Laureta." Adobo Nation.  Web. 6 June 2013.  <https://web.archive.org/web/20160304001646/http://216.246.97.58/~adobo/adobo-close-up-cheesa-and-troy-laureta/>
"Who We Are."  The Assembly Entertainment. Web. 6 June 2013. <https://archive.today/20130620014834/http://theassemblyent.com/?page_id=11>
Admin.  "NBC's The Voice Star CHEESA to Headline at CAF 2013." Cleveland Asian Festival.  15 April 2013.  Web. 6 June 2013. <http://clevelandasianfestival.org/2013/nbcs-the-voice-star-cheesa-to-headline-at-2013-caf/>
Arellano, Yves.  "Cheesa Laureta's New Single, 'I'm Not Perfect' (Feat. Charice) Released!" Yves Arellano 6 September 2012.  Web. 6 June 2013.<http://yvesarellano.wordpress.com/2012/09/06/cheesa-lauretas-new-single-im-not-perfect-feat-charice-released/>
Seaton, Jake. "Live blogging 'The Voice': Night 5". WNCN. 27 February 2012.  Web. 8 May 2013.  <NBC17.com>
Goldberg, Lesley. "'The Voice' Nabs Ne-Yo, Robin Thicke, Miranda Lambert, 5 More As Advisers". Hollywood Reporter. 6 January 2012. Web. 8 May 2013. <http://www.hollywoodreporter.com/idol-worship/voice-guest-advisers-279170>

American women pop singers
American musicians of Filipino descent
1990 births
Living people
21st-century American singers
21st-century American women singers